Petros Pappas (born 6 May 1953) is a Greek sports shooter. He competed in the mixed skeet event at the 1980 Summer Olympics.

References

1953 births
Living people
Greek male sport shooters
Olympic shooters of Greece
Shooters at the 1980 Summer Olympics
Place of birth missing (living people)
20th-century Greek people